Gadkari is a surname native to the Indian state of Maharashtra. Gadkari surname is found among the Hindu CKP and Deshastha Brahmin communities.

Etymology
The name Gadkari is believed to be a combination of two words (Gad and Kari). Gad means a fort and Kari means one who maintains or protects it. So Gadkari means a person who protects the fort.

Gadkari as a title
Gadkari was a historical title given mostly in Maharashtra, to a person who was appointed to protect the fort.

Notable people
 Ram Ganesh Gadkari (1885-1919), Marathi poet
 Chandrasekhar Gadkari (1928-1998), Indian test cricketer
 Madhav Yeshwant Gadkari (1928–2006), Indian Journalist, Padma Shri award recipient
 Nitin Gadkari (born 1957), Indian politician
 Sandesh Gadkari (born 1987), Indian cricketer
 Jui Gadkari (born 1988), Indian actress

References